Ernest William Brady (10 November 1917 – 13 May 2003) was Dean of Edinburgh from 1976 to 1982; and again from 1985 to 1986.

He was educated at  Harris Academy, the University of St Andrews and Edinburgh Theological College. He was ordained Deacon in 1942  and priest in 1943. He held curacies at Christ Church, Glasgow and St Alphage, Hendon; and incumbencies at All Saints Buckie,  All Saints Edinburgh and the  Priory Church of St Mary of Mount Carmel, South Queensferry before his time as Dean.

Notes

1917 births
2003 deaths
People educated at Harris Academy
Alumni of the University of St Andrews
Alumni of Edinburgh Theological College
Scottish Episcopalian clergy
Deans of Edinburgh